Pete Sampras was the defending champion, but did not compete this year.

Greg Rusedski won the title by defeating Mark Philippoussis 6–3, 7–6(8–6), 7–6(7–3) in the final.

Seeds

Draw

Finals

Top half

Bottom half

References

External links
 Official results archive (ATP)
 Official results archive (ITF)

1997 ATP Tour
1997 Davidoff Swiss Indoors